Windfall Indiana World War II POW Camp was a World War II German prisoner-of-war camp from 1944 to 1945 in Windfall, Indiana, United States. The camp was located near the site of the Windfall High School. The location, on the northeast side of town, is now home to a mobile home community. At its peak the camp housed 1,500 German prisoners and their prison officers. The prisoners were put to work laboring on local farms.

References

Returning to Remember

Further reading
Contact the Tipton County Historical Society for the booklet "Returning to Remember" for first person accounts of the POW camp.

World War II prisoner of war camps in the United States
Indiana in World War II
Military installations in Indiana
Buildings and structures in Tipton County, Indiana
1944 establishments in Indiana
1945 disestablishments in Indiana